CAAC or Caac may refer to:
 Civil Aviation Administration of China, which oversees civil aviation in China.
 CAAC Airlines, China's former monopoly airline operated by CAAC
 Capital Area Activities Conference, a high school sports league centered on Lansing, Michigan, USA
 Cardiff Amateur Athletic Club, a Cardiff-based athletics club 
 Working Group on Children and Armed Conflict, United Nations
 Chinese Athletics Administrative Center, a sporting governing body in China
 Computer-Aided Algorithmic Composition
 The Contemporary African Art Collection, a private collection created in 1990 by Italian business man Jean Pigozzi
 Cyclic alkyl amino carbenes, a class of chemical substances with a low valent carbon atom
 Caac language, spoken in New Caledonia.